The Dimitriadis model 505 was a Greek microcar developed in 1958 by G. Dimitriadis, founder of the Bioplastic boat and automobile manufacturer. This car represented his first effort in automobile production, and was presented in a number of exhibitions in Greece. According to Mr. Dimitriadis, its production was eventually considered non-profitable compared to that of three-wheelers (which were taxed much more favorably). Thus, he switched to the licence production of the German Fuldamobil three-wheeler (rebadged as the Attica).

References 
L.S. Skartsis and G.A. Avramidis, "Made in Greece", Typorama, Patras, Greece (2003)  (republished by the Patras Science Park, 2007)
L.S. Skartsis, "Greek Vehicle & Machine Manufacturers 1800 to present: A Pictorial History", Marathon (2012)  (eBook)

External links
1958 Dimitriadis 505 in Dutch Auto Catalog

Cars of Greece
Microcars